KTV Ltd. is a DVB-T SD and HD encrypted UHF TV and radio service operating in Stanley, capital of the Falkland Islands, and also in part of the Camp. The charge for receiving the service of up to 56 TV and radio channels is from £36 per month. Founded in 1980 by Sharon and Mario Zuvic Bulic, KTV Ltd. receives channels from the UK, the US, Saint Helena Island and Chile and rebroadcasts them to subscribers in the Falkland Islands. KTV Ltd. cooperates with a number of other small radio broadcasting companies in other British overseas territories, notably Saint FM in St Helena, the Falkland Islands Radio Service (FIRS), and Myriam's Country.

Channel listing

Other operations 
KTV Ltd. operates Radio Nova, a rebroadcast service for BBC World Service, BBC World News, and Saint FM in association with the stations on FM, MW and DVB-T (Digital Terrestrial).

Competitors 
The only other broadcasters licensed to operate in the Falkland Islands are the local radio station FIRS and the British Forces Broadcasting Service (BFBS).

See also 
Falkland Islands Radio Service FIRS.

External links 
 KTV Ltd.
 

Communications in the Falkland Islands